Michael Dowd (born November 19, 1958) is an American progressive Christian minister, author, and eco-theologian known as an advocate of Big History, religious naturalism, sustainability, climate activism, and the epic of evolution.

His evangelizing to some 2,000 audiences starting in April 2002 provided material for Thank God for Evolution in 2008. The book was endorsed by six Nobel Prize-winning scientists. On April 2, 2009, Dowd at the United Nations addressed the lack of an evolutionary worldview which he maintains has resulted in a global integrity crisis. Overcoming this crisis, he says, requires a deep time view of human nature, values and social systems. He maintains a Christian perspective and accepts the theory of evolution.

Dowd expanded his outreach program with the founding of EvolutionaryChristianity.com in 2010. Thirty-eight religious leaders from diverse backgrounds joined him in an audio seminar introduction. In spite of their dissimilar religious orientations and backgrounds, they hold many perspectives in common; such as valuing Big History (deep time), a global ethos, and realistic expectations grounded in an understanding of scientific (Evidence of common descent), historical (human history), and cross-cultural facts (cultural evolution) as "divine communication". This program has drawn both rebuttals and praise from Christian sources.

Biography
Dowd, raised Roman Catholic, graduated from Evangel University in Springfield, Missouri summa cum laude receiving a B.A. in philosophy and biblical studies. He went on to earn a Master of Divinity degree with honors at Eastern Baptist Theological Seminary (now Palmer Seminary) in Philadelphia. Dowd was ordained as a minister in the United Church of Christ and served as a congregational minister for nine years in churches in Massachusetts, Ohio, and Michigan.

In 1995 he worked with Jewish, Roman Catholic, Protestant, Evangelical, Unitarian Universalist, and New Thought leaders across America on environmental  issues that were being considered by Congress. He was Religious Organizer for the Washington D.C. based National Environmental Trust. From 1997 to 2000 he headed The Portland Sustainable Lifestyle Campaign, in Portland, Oregon, the first government-funded program designed to produce large-scale voluntary citizen behavior change along stewardship lines in the United States. In 2000 and 2001 he served as Campaign Manager of Global Action Plan's EcoTeam and Livable Neighborhood Programs in Rockland County, New York.

He became an itinerant "evolutionary evangelist" in 2002. Dowd and his wife Connie Barlow travel North America, teaching their "Gospel of Evolution." They present their case for "the marriage of religion and science" at events sponsored by a diverse group of denominations, including  Christian, Unitarian Universalist, Unity Church, Free Thinkers,  Religious Science,  secular humanism and Religious Naturalists venues. Barlow is a writer/lecturer with four published works. Together they travel the continent by van as nomads, offering a view of evolutionary theology and relating their Great Story (Epic of Evolution) to both secular and religious audiences. Their message embraces both science and religion, combining her scientific humanism with his evolutionary theism, her soft-spoken manner with his zealous preaching style. They draw in Muslims, Jews, Buddhists, and Christians; theists and atheists; scientists and philosophers.

Philosophy and theology
Dowd is a former young earth creationist.  Dowd describes himself as having been "born again" while serving in the United States Army in Germany in 1979, and for the next three years living within a fundamentalist culture that was strongly opposed to evolution. Thereafter he came under a more eclectic range of religious influences (including a friendship with a "Buddhist-Christian" former Trappist monk, Tobias Meeker), that opened him up to first intellectual, and then spiritual, acceptance of evolution.

Dowd is pluralistic in his ministry. He teaches that humanity will never see an end to the science and religion war until religious leaders do their part and proclaim a pro-science, evolutionary message from the pulpit. Dowd promotes the Epic of Evolution as a sacred story and Religious Naturalism as his own religious orientation. It addresses both objective truth and subjective meaning answering questions in ways that are both religiously and scientifically accurate.  He claims that science can be interpreted in ways that nourish and inspire people like traditional religious stories do.

Colleen Engel-Brown, former pastor at a First Unity Church, believes Dowd has a "very provoking message". Accepting evolution as plausible "disturbs those who take the Bible literally".
 Even the Dowd vehicle provokes as it  displays two fishes kissing with the labels "Jesus" and "Darwin". His message of evolutionary theology attaches a lot of attention as a subject that opens up the debate on the creation–evolution controversy. Both sides of this debate have been at it for a century and a half. Dowd attempts to serve as a pacifier by showing people that celebrating Big History and interpreting it meaningfully will bring them nearer to spiritual fulfillment.

By utilizing traditional religious methods, Dowd invites "people to think about religion in new ways". Stephen Uhl, a former Catholic priest-become humanist psychologist, writes that Dowd does a great job of expanding minds beyond sectarian belief systems and entertains while doing it.

Works
Dowd's Earthspirit: A Handbook for Nurturing an Ecological Christianity (1991, Twenty-third Publications)
was inspired by the writings of cultural historian Thomas Berry, cosmologist Brian Swimme, and deep ecologist Joanna Macy. His preachings since 2002 provided material for Thank God for Evolution (2008), a work influenced by Thomas Berry and David Sloan Wilson, among others, and endorsed by six Nobel Prize-winning scientists: Craig Mello, John C. Mather, Thomas C. Schelling, Frank Wilczek, Lee Hartwell and Charles Townes. Starting in the spring of 2008, Professor Hogue at the Meadville Lombard Theological School was using Dowd's book in his course on theology and science. Penguin purchased the worldwide rights to it in mid-2008.

 * Thank God for Evolution: How the Marriage of Science and Religion Will Transform Your Life and Our World – Viking Adult (June 19, 2008), 
 * Earthspirit: A Handbook for Nurturing an Ecological Christianity, – 23 Pubns, (April 1991), 
 * THE MEANING OF LIFE IN THE 1990s: An Ecological, Christian Perspective 
 * Study Guide - Thank God for Evolution, 4 hr DVD

See also
 Ecotheology
 Evolutionary psychology of religion
 Liberal Christianity
 Progressive Christianity
 Religion and environmentalism
 Spiritual ecology
 Theistic evolution

References

Further reading
By Connie Barlow Exceptional Wisdom Radio (Dowd's wife and ministry companion)
The Ghosts of Evolution – Basic Books (February 28, 2002), 
Green Space, Green Time: The Way of Science – Springer; 1 edition (September 26, 1997), 
Evolution Extended: Biological Debates on the Meaning of Life – The MIT Press (August 4, 1995), 
From Gaia to Selfish Genes – The MIT Press (July 8, 1992), 
 Brian Swimme – The Universe Story: From the Primordial Flaring Forth to the Ecozoic Era: A Celebration of the Unfolding of the Cosmos, Harper Collins, 1992 (1994)
Jerome A. Stone –  Religious Naturalism Today: The Rebirth of a Forgotten Alternative,  State University of New York Press, 2008, 
Chet Raymo – When God Is Gone, Everything Is Holy: Making of a Religious Naturalist, Sorin Books (September 2008), 
 Ursula Goodenough – Sacred Depths of Nature, Oxford University Press, USA; 1 edition (June 15, 2000), 
 Eric Chaisson – Epic of Evolution, Columbia University Press (March 2, 2007), 
 Loyal Rue – Everybody's Story: Wising Up to the Epic of Evolution, State University of New York Press, 1999, 
 The Oxford Handbook of Religion and Science, chapter: The Sacred Emergence of Nature by Ursula Goodenough and Terrence Deacon.

External links
 Dowd's video, audio, and text publications / Education and work background
 Michael Dowd personal site
 Religious Naturalist Association
 Information on Religious Naturalism
 Epic of Evolution
 Thank God for Evolution
 Evidence as Divine Communication: Realizing Faith

1958 births
Living people
American evangelists
American religious writers
Converts to Protestantism from Roman Catholicism
Evangel University alumni
Palmer Theological Seminary alumni
Religious naturalists